Tuleara is a monotypic genus of potter wasps which is endemic to Madagascar. The sole species is Tuleara leptochiloides.

References

Biological pest control wasps
Monotypic Hymenoptera genera
Potter wasps